
Franco Scaglione (26 September 1916 – 19 June 1993) was an Italian automobile coachwork designer.

Biography
Franco Scaglione was born in Florence to Vittorio Scaglione, a chief army doctor, and to Giovanna Fabbri, captain of the Italian Red Cross service. His was a well-to-do family of noble ancestry (count of Martirano San Nicola and of Mottafilocastro). At the age of 6, he and his younger brother became fatherless.
His studies were of humanistic leanings, but he entered the university of Aeronautical Engineering. His favourite hobbies were reading, tennis, riding and rowing. He went into military service with the rank of sub-lieutenant in the sappers, the Genio Pontieri. He continued his studies, but at the outbreak of the Second World War he volunteered to be assigned to a more destructive unit, the Genio Guastatori and was sent to the Libyan front. On Christmas Eve 1941, he was taken prisoner by the British at El Duda, a village to the south of Tobruk. He was to be interned at the Yol detention camp in India, where he remained until the end of 1946. He returned to Italy on Boxing Day that year with the last boat used for the carrying of prisoners. He rejoined his mother (his brother Eugenio was killed during the war) in Carolei, near Cosenza, and stayed with her for almost a year.
At the beginning of 1948 he went to Bologna in search of a job; he already had it in mind to work as a stylist in the automobile field, his real passion. Initially he devoted his time to sketching clothing for fashion houses, which was very profitable, but his vocation was automobile coachwork design. On 25 September 1948 he married Maria Luisa Benvenuti and two years later, on 10 September, his daughter Giovanna was born.
In April, 1951, he moved to Turin, where there were the major coachbuilding firms, and he contacted Battista Farina, who very much appreciated his renderings. However, this did not result in collaboration, as Farina did not allow his models to be linked to the designer’s name. He met Nuccio Bertone and finally an association was born, which led him to create automobiles such as the Alfa Romeo B.A.T.s, the Giulietta Sprint and Sprint Speciale and many others. In 1959 he concluded the exclusive relationship with the Bertone coachworks and worked on his own. His first collaboration as a freelancer was with Carlo Abarth and Porsche, and he designed the Porsche 356 B Abarth Carrera GTL, the acclaimed design forerunner of the 911. Then Scaglione conceived the Lamborghini 350 GTV, the ATS 2500 GT, the 1900 Skyline Sprint for the Japanese Prince company (later to merge in 1966 with Nissan), the Titania Veltro GTT, and various models for Intermeccanica such as the Apollo, Torino, Italia GFX, Italia IMX, Indra. In 1967, he designed for Alfa Romeo's Autodelta the legendary Alfa Romeo 33 Stradale, said by many to be one of the most beautiful cars ever made.
Alas, Intermeccanica became bankrupt and the entrepreneur owner, Frank Reisner, moved to Canada. Franco Scaglione, having put his own savings in the production of the Indra, was disillusioned and retired from work.
In 1981 he moved to Suvereto, a little village in the province of Livorno, where he lived a very secluded life. In July, 1991, he was diagnosed with lung cancer. He died two years later.

Designs

1952

Fiat 1100 "Utiletta Frasca" (Carrozzeria Ansaloni)
 Abarth 1500 Biposto Coupé Bertone
Siata 208 CS sports racing
Siata 208 CS coupé 2+2
Lancia Aurelia B53 Balbo (One-off)

1953

Fiat 1100 /103 TV Savio Sport berlinetta
Alfa Romeo Berlinetta Aerodinamica Tecnica (B.A.T.) 5
Alfa Romeo 1900L two-door saloon Bertone
Arnolt-Aston Martin DB2/4 sports racing Bertone (2 examples)
Arnolt-Aston Martin DB2/4 spider Bertone
Ferrari-Abarth 166 MM/53 sports racing Bertone
Arnolt-Bristol 404 X sports racing Bertone

1954

Arnolt-Bristol 404 X spider gran turismo Bertone
Arnolt-Bristol 404 X coupé gran turismo Bertone
Siata 208 CS coupé
Alfa Romeo 2000 Sportiva racing berlinetta (prototype) Bertone
Alfa Romeo 2000 Sportiva sports racing (prototype) Bertone
Alfa Romeo Giulietta Sprint berlinetta Bertone
Alfa Romeo Berlinetta Aerodinamica Tecnica (B.A.T.) 7
Fiat-Stanguellini 1100 /103 TV berlinetta Bertone
Fiat-Stanguellini 1100 /103 TV 'Cheetah' spider Bertone

1955

Alfa Romeo Giulietta Sprint Spider prototype 002 Bertone
Alfa Romeo Giulietta Sprint Spider prototype 004 Bertone
Alfa Romeo 1900 convertible “Perla” Bertone
Alfa Romeo Berlinetta Aerodinamica Tecnica (B.A.T.) 9

1956
Fiat-Abarth 750 Record Bertone
Fiat Abarth 215 A Coupé Bertone
Fiat Abarth 216 A Spyder Bertone
Arnolt-Aston Martin DB2/4 convertible Bertone

1957

Fiat-Stanguellini 1200 spider 'America' Bertone
Aston Martin DB2/4 coupé Bertone
Jaguar XK150 coupé Bertone
Alfa Romeo Giulietta Sprint Speciale berlinetta Bertone

1958

Alfa Romeo-Abarth 1000 berlinetta competizione, for Bertone
NSU Prinz Sport coupé (the first 1700 or so, constructed by Bertone)
 
(Developed from Scaglione design but built in his absence):
NSU Prinz Sport spider Wankel (prototype 1960, produced from 1963)

1959
Maserati 3500 GT coupé Bertone
Fiat-O.S.C.A. 1500 berlinetta Bertone
Fiat 1200 “Granluce” berlinetta Bertone
Alfa Romeo 2000 “Sole” Bertone
NSU Prinz 4 two-door saloon prototype

1960
Porsche 356 B Carrera GTL Abarth berlinetta, Carrozzeria Rocco Motto

1961
Redesign for Intermeccanica “Apollo” berlinetta 2+2

1962
Maserati Tipo 64 'Supercage'

1963

Prince Motors 'Skyline 1900 Sprint' berlinetta
Apollo GT
Apollo convertible
Lamborghini 350 GTV coupé prototype
Stanguellini-Guzzi 'Colibrì' record runner
ATS 2500 GT

1964
Intermeccanica “Griffith” coupé (and convertible?)

1966
Titania “Veltro GTT”
Intermeccanica “Torino” convertible and coupé

1967

Alfa Romeo 33 Stradale
Intermeccanica “Italia GFX” convertible and coupé

1968
LMX Sirex

1970
Intermeccanica “Italia IMX” berlinetta competizione

1971
Intermeccanica “Indra” convertible

1972
Intermeccanica “Indra” coupé

Gallery

References

External links 

1916 births
1993 deaths
Engineers from Florence
Italian automobile designers
Pininfarina people